Soviet Championship may refer to:

 Russian Volleyball Super League
 Soviet Championship (rugby union)
 Soviet Championship League, ice hockey league
 USSR Chess Championship

See also 
 USSR Championship (disambiguation)